Casa Air Service was a Moroccan airline.  In 1995 it began to offer private air transport services.  For 40 years prior to that, it was involved in agricultural air services.

Its main base was Mohammed V International Airport, Casablanca.

Destinations
Algeria
In Salah - (In Salah Airport)
Oran - (Oran Airport)
Tamanrasset - (Aguenar – Hadj Bey Akhamok Airport)
Morocco
Al Hoceima - (Cherif Al Idrissi Airport)
Agadir - (Agadir Airport)
Agadir (Taroudant)- (Al Kasbah National Airport)
Casablanca - (Mohammed V International Airport) hub
Casablanca - (Anfa Airport)
Dakhla - (Dakhla Airport)
Essaouira - (Mogador Airport)
Errachidia - (Moulay Ali Cherif Airport)
Fes - (Fes-Saïss Airport)
Guelmim - (Guelmim Airport)
Ifrane - (Ifrane Airport)
Laayoune - (Hassan Airport)
Marrakech - (Marrakech-Menara Airport)
Meknes - (Meknes Airport)
Nador - (Nador International Airport)
Ouarzazate - (Ouarzazate Airport)
Oujda - (Angads Airport)
Rabat - (Rabat-Sale Airport) hub
Sidi Ifni - (Sidi Ifni Airport)
Smara - (Smara Airport)
Tangier - (Ibn Batouta International Airport) hub
Tarfaya - (Tarfaya Airport)
Tan-Tan - (Tan Tan Airport)
Tetouan - (Sania Ramel Airport)
Spain
Almeria (Almeria Airport)
Melilla (Melilla Airport)

Fleet 
1 Corvette 100 - (Aérospatiale Corvette)
1 Cessna 414
1 Cessna 182
2 Embraer 135
1 Fokker 70

Further reading 
  — a profile of Nadia Lyoussi, director general of Casa Air Service

External links

References

Defunct airlines of Morocco
Airlines established in 1995
Companies based in Casablanca
1995 establishments in Morocco